Milecastle 50TW (High House) was a milecastle on the Turf Wall section of Hadrian's Wall.  The milecastle is located close to the Birdoswald Roman Fort and is unique in that it was not replaced by a stone milecastle when the turf wall was upgraded to stone, the replacement wall instead running some 200m to the north.  The milecastle was partially demolished by the Romans after it was abandoned.  The milecastle was excavated in 1934 and several Roman rubbish pits discovered.  The remains of the two turrets associated with this milecastle (which were demolished when the turf wall was abandoned) have also been located.  As the turf wall lies some distance from the stone wall, the sites are not accessible from the Hadrian's Wall Path.

Description
Milecastle 50TW was constructed as part of the turf wall section of Hadrian's Wall, and is situated to the west of Birdoswald fort. It is unique in being the only original turf wall milecastle where the stone wall milecastle built to replace it was not constructed on the same site; this is due to the divergent nature of the original turf wall, and replacement stone wall at this reach.

All milecastles on the turf wall section of Hadrian's Wall were thought to have been constructed with turf ramparts, with a wooden tower over the north gate.  There are no visible remains of Milecastle 50TW, however a corresponding causeway across the wall ditch is discernible; one of only two milecastles where such a structure survives, the other being Milecastle 25.  A wooden culvert was initially used to allow water to flow beneath the causeway, but this was later replaced with a stone culvert.

Construction 
Milecastle 50TW measured  x  (long-axis type). The ramparts measured  at the base. It has been speculated that the additional posts were used to support the extra weight imposed by a tower above the north gateway, not required over the south gateway.

Evidence of an internal timber structure (dimensions  x  was identified in the eastern side of the milecastle (southern end).  The structure was divided into two unequal rooms, each containing the remains of a hearth.  A better used hearth was located outside, and to the north of this structure.  A large pot was discovered set into the ground, and connected to a drain, beside the south gate.  It is presumed that this was used as a latrine.  A stairway base (located in the north eastern corner of the milecastle) was also discovered.

Vallum 
The vallum ditch and south mound divert to the south to accommodate the milecastle.  The north vallum mound (absent from Milecastle 49 westwards), restarts at Milecastle 50TW's west rampart.  A stone-revetted causeway was constructed across the vallum ditch, with a corresponding gap in the south mound.  This was later replaced with a wider crossing.

Demolition 
As part of the first phase of extension of the stone wall westwards from Milecastle 49, Milecastle 50TW was demolished.  The evidence found during the 1934 excavation indicated a purposeful dismantling of both gates, and the digging of pits to bury bedding, and other detritus.

Excavations and investigations
1933 – Nothing was found at the measured position of Milecastle 50TW, though a smooth platform slightly to the west was noticed, and trenches dug.  This revealed cobbled foundations and 2nd century pottery.
1934 – The platform was fully excavated and the construction details established. The demolition process was noted, including the contents of pits dug to dispose of rubbish, including:.
The remains of bedding
The damaged leaf of a wooden writing tablet
A bundle of leather tent fragments
A broken drinking mug
A fragment of an inscription cut into an oak panel.  This is thought to include parts of the names of the Emperor Hadrian and the Governor, Aulus Platorius Nepos. (R.I.B.# 1935).
1971 – English Heritage Field Investigation. Lack of visible remains was noted, and the location of the site confirmed.
1990 – The site was revisited as part of the Hadrian's Wall Project. No visible remains were identified, with the exception of the causeway across the ditch.

Associated turrets 
Each milecastle on Hadrian's Wall had two associated turret structures. These turrets were positioned approximately one-third and two-thirds of a Roman mile to the west of the Milecastle, and would probably have been manned by part of the milecastle's garrison. The turrets associated with Milecastle 50TW are known as Turret 50A TW and Turret 50B TW.  Both turrets were demolished when the turf wall was replaced with a stone wall.

Turret 50A TW

Location:  (Ordnance Survey National Grid Coordinates)>

Turret 50B TW
Its external dimensions were  square, and the north and south faces both contained a plinth. A hearth was discovered a little to the east of centre of the floor. This suggests that the door may have been located on the west of the south wall.

Location:  (Ordnance Survey National Grid Coordinates)>

Monument records

Public access
Although there are no visible remains at any of the three sites, they are all visible (but not accessible) from the Hadrian's Wall path.  The nearest accessible parking is at Birdoswald.

References

Bibliography

50TW